Bouna Junior Sarr (born 31 January 1992) is a professional footballer who plays as a right back and winger for  club Bayern Munich. Born in France, he plays for the Senegal national team.

Club career

Marseille
Sarr signed for Marseille on 7 July 2015.

On 3 May 2018, he played in the Europa League semi-finals away to FC Red Bull Salzburg as Marseille played out a 1–2 away loss but a 3–2 aggregate win to secure a place in the 2018 UEFA Europa League Final which was played at the Parc Olympique Lyonnais in Décines-Charpieu, Lyon, France on 16 May 2018, against Atlético Madrid.

Bayern Munich
On 5 October 2020, Sarr signed for Bundesliga club Bayern Munich on a four-year deal. Sarr made his debut for Bayern in the first round of the DFB-Pokal on 15 October and provided two assists to fellow new signing Eric Maxim Choupo-Moting as the club defeated fifth division side 1. FC Düren by a score of 3–0. On 25 August 2021, he scored his first goal for the club in the same competition, in the first round of the following season, in a 12–0 hammering of fifth division club Bremer SV.

International career
Sarr was born in France to a Senegalese father and a Guinean mother. He was called up by the Guinea national team in December 2014, but he did not play for them. In late April 2018, he was approached by the Senegal national team and turned down the offer. However, Sarr decided to represent Senegal as he was called up in late September 2021 by Aliou Cissé for the upcoming 2022 FIFA World Cup qualifiers against Namibia, Togo and Congo. He debuted with Senegal in a 4–1 2022 FIFA World Cup qualification win over Namibia on 9 October 2021. Sarr was called up for the Senegal national team to compete in the 2021 Africa Cup of Nations, where he played every match, eventually winning in the final against Egypt.

Career statistics

Club

International

Honours
Marseille
UEFA Europa League runner-up: 2017–18

Bayern Munich
 Bundesliga: 2020–21, 2021–22
 DFL-Supercup: 2021
 FIFA Club World Cup: 2020

Senegal
 Africa Cup of Nations: 2021

References

External links

Profile at the FC Bayern Munich website

1992 births
Living people
Footballers from Lyon
Citizens of Senegal through descent
Senegalese footballers
Senegal international footballers
French footballers
Senegalese people of Guinean descent
Sportspeople of Guinean descent
French sportspeople of Senegalese descent
French sportspeople of Guinean descent
Association football defenders
Association football wingers
FC Metz players
Olympique de Marseille players
FC Bayern Munich footballers
Ligue 2 players
Championnat National players
Ligue 1 players
Bundesliga players
2021 Africa Cup of Nations players
Africa Cup of Nations-winning players
Senegalese expatriate footballers
French expatriate footballers
Senegalese expatriate sportspeople in Germany
French expatriate sportspeople in Germany
Expatriate footballers in Germany
Black French sportspeople